Loveless in Los Angeles, an indie romantic comedy film completed in 2006 and written and directed by Archie Gips, stars Dash Mihok, Brittany Daniel, Navi Rawat, Geoffrey Arend, James Lesure, Chris Coppola and Stephen Tobolowsky.

Plot
Dave Randall, a jaded, womanizing, reality dating TV producer, runs into his old college crush, Kelly, and soon realizes his bar-hopping, bed-hopping ways are leaving him unfulfilled. Dave has Kelly — the only woman he's ever loved — re-train him to become the nice guy he used to be.

References

External links

2007 films
2007 romantic comedy films
American independent films
American romantic comedy films
2007 independent films
2000s English-language films
2000s American films